Cania Gorge is a national park in the North Burnett Region, Queensland, Australia, in the locality of Cania.

Geography 

The park is 373 km northwest of Brisbane. The nearest town is Monto. Three Moon Creek is the name of the waterway that runs along the length of the gorge.

The park's most dominant features are the 70 m sandstone cliffs. Wildlife native to the park include rock wallabys, bettong, platypus, geckos and over 90 bird species. The flora is diverse, with more than 150 species found in the region, including cypress pine woodland, eucalypt woodland, brigalow forest, dry rainforest and grassland.

Aboriginal rock art on the cliff walls is an indication of indigenous settlement of at least 19,000 years.

A picnic area is located alongside the main road into the park, 8 km from the Burnett Highway. Facilities here include covered picnic tables, toilets and gas-powered barbecues. The majority of the park's walking tracks lead from this picnic area, including the 1.1 km trail to Dripping Rock, 1.6 km trail to The Overhang, and the 1.3 km trail to Bloodwood Cave. The longest track in the park leads from a small car park 500 metres south of the picnic area. This 5.6 km circuit takes in Giants Chair Lookout, with views across the gorge; and Fern Tree Pool, a permanent waterhole. Only walkers with moderate levels of fitness should attempt this track. Another walk leads visitors to a former mine site.

See also

 Cania Dam
 Protected areas of Queensland
 Boyne Valley, Queensland

References

External links

 

National parks of Queensland
Protected areas established in 1977
Wide Bay–Burnett
1977 establishments in Australia